Benbow State Recreation Area is a state park unit of California in the United States.

Benbow dam was constructed across the South Fork Eel River in 1931 to provide hydroelectric power for development in Garberville, impounding a reservoir.  The Benbow family, interested in preserving the natural scene along the river, made efforts to place the land under state protection. In 1956 funds were approved for the Benbow Project and the first  were purchased in 1958. Due to the negative impact on the migrating salmon and damage to the river banks, work began to remove the dam in August 2016. In the winter of 2017, removal of the dam was completed.

There are campsites and a large day-use picnic area. Hiking, picnicking and camping are popular summer time activities, while salmon and steelhead fishing are popular in the winter.

See also
 List of California state parks

References

California State Recreation Areas
Campgrounds in California
Parks in Humboldt County, California
Protected areas established in 1958
1958 establishments in California